WVAW-LD (channel 16) is a low-power television station in Charlottesville, Virginia, United States, affiliated with ABC. It is owned by Lockwood Broadcast Group alongside dual CBS/Fox affiliate WCAV (channel 19). Both stations share studios on Rio East Court in Charlottesville, while WVAW-LD's transmitter is located on Carters Mountain south of the city.

Due to WVAW-LD's low-power status, its broadcast radius only covers the immediate Charlottesville area. Therefore, it must rely on cable and satellite to reach the entire market.

History

What is now WVAW-LD originally debuted on June 12, 1979 on analog UHF channel 64 with the call sign W64AO. The station was a low-powered translator of WHSV-TV, which was the area's default ABC affiliate. At the time, WHSV-TV was owned by Worrell Newspapers along with the Charlottesville Daily Progress.

On April 9, 2004, W64AO moved to UHF channel 16, changed call letters to WVAW-LP, upgraded power, and separated from WHSV-TV. WVAW-LP was the market's third local station after WVIR-TV (channel 29) and WCAV.

In early 2005, after the launch of WCAV and WVAW, Gray Television launched a third station in the area, Fox affiliate WAHU-CA. WVAW was temporarily taken off-the-air by a fire on its transmitter tower at the top of Carters Mountain on November 9, 2006. The signal was restored on November 13. On December 28, WVAW moved to Comcast channel 3.

The new set of stations replaced out-of-market stations from Richmond and Washington, D.C. on local cable. On Comcast's system in Charlottesville, the only remaining out-of-market channel on the basic tier is WTTG, although WRIC-TV, WWBT and WTVR-TV remain on the digital tier.

On October 27, 2009, WVAW's digital transmitter had a glitch over-the-air. The signal was put on WAHU-CD2 for a short time and the problem was fixed a day later.

Gray announced the sale of WVAW-LD and WCAV to Lockwood Broadcast Group on March 4, 2019. The sale is concurrent with Gray's purchase of rival WVIR-TV from Waterman Broadcasting. WAHU-CD was not included in the sale and would be retained by Gray as a sister station to WVIR-TV. The transaction was completed on October 1.

Programming

Syndicated programming
Syndicated programming on the station includes Rachael Ray, Tamron Hall, The People's Court, The Drew Barrymore Show, The Jennifer Hudson Show, Family Feud, and Pictionary.

Newscasts
WVAW presently broadcasts 17½ hours of locally produced newscasts each week (with 3½ hours each weekday and 30 minutes each on Saturdays and Sundays).

WVAW and its sister stations employ the largest television news team dedicated exclusively to the Charlottesville market. While WVIR dedicates some staff to adjacent areas, WVAW focuses its coverage solely on the counties that comprise the Charlottesville viewing area. As the primary station in the CBS19 News operation, WCAV airs the most newscasts. WVAW simulcasts the 2½ hours of Good Morning Charlottesville on weekday mornings from 4:30–7:00am, as well as simulcasting CBS19 News at 6 and CBS19 News at 11.

Technical information

Subchannels
The station's digital signal is multiplexed:

Analog-to-digital conversion
WVAW shut down its analog signal, over UHF channel 16, on February 16, 2009, and "flash-cut" its digital signal into operation UHF channel 16. It also changed its calls to the current WVAW-LD with "LD" standing for low-power digital.

References

External links
Official website

ABC network affiliates
MeTV affiliates
Lockwood Broadcast Group
Television channels and stations established in 1979
Low-power television stations in the United States
VAW-LD
1979 establishments in Virginia